Nomad studies (Russian:) is a branch of historical and anthropological studies specialised in cultures and the history of nomad peoples, particularly the Eurasian nomads and the history of the Eurasian steppes. Studies of the Eurasian nomads influence the political idea of Eurasianism.

Among notable researchers in that field were Lev Gumilyov, Pyotr Savitskiy, Sergei Rudenko, George Vernadsky, Nikolai Trubetzkoy, Hara-Davan Erendzhen, Mikhail Artamonov, and others.

According to Savitskiy, the history of Scythians and Huns encompasses in general (within historically foreseeable events) over 12 centuries. Savitskiy claims that the nomad culture of Scythians and Huns should be considered as a culture of horse and iron.

External links
 Historical Studies: on daily agenda nomadic studies (Историческая наука: на повестке дня кочевниковедение). Caravan Media Portal. 3 December 2007
 Official website. The Center for the Study of Eurasian Nomads (part of the American-Eurasian Research Institute)
  Savitskiy, P.N. About issues of nomad studies (Why Scythians and Huns must be of interest for Russians (О задачах кочевниковедения (Почему скифы и гунны должны быть интересны для русского?)). Eurasian Publishing (by kulichki). Prague, 1928.

Eurasian history
Eurasianism
Nomads
Nomadic groups in Eurasia
Oriental studies